Saidpur is a city of Nilphamari district in Rangpur Division of Bangladesh. The city has become a very important communication hub for adjoining major district headquarters. Saidpur Airport is one of the domestic airports in Bangladesh. The Syeddpur Railway Workshop, established in 1870, is the largest in Bangladesh and was the major railway workshop for Assam-Bengal railway. The city has historically been an Urdu-speaking community with close ties to Bihar.

History
The city of Saiddpur was established around the Saidpur Railway Workshop, established in 1870 by the British Colonial regime. Nothing is known about the origin of the upazila's name. It is learned that in the long past there came a Sayed family from Koch Bihar of India and settled in this area and started preaching Islam. It is generally believed that the Upazila might have derived its name, Saidpur, from the name of that Said family. Saidpur became Thana in 1915.

Administration
The municipality of Saidpur was incorporated in 1958. The city is divided into 15 wards and 43 mahallas. A municipality mayor is elected every 5 years. This role is currently filled by Rafika Akhter Jahan, a Bangladesh Awami League politician who was elected as the city's first female mayor in February 2021.

Demographics 

The city has a population of 127,104 in 26,333 households. Saidpur has a sex ratio of 953 females to 1000 males and a literacy rate of 63.9%.

Economy
The city is the commercial hub for the surrounding districts. The biggest railway workshop of Bangladesh is here. The city never sleeps, it is also known as the city of night. Business always runs here night and day. The city center has many government and private banks, insurance companies, residential hotels, Chinese and Indian restaurants, fast food, sweet shops, gift shops, and many more. It is an important economic zone in Bangladesh.
Recently local businessmen have invested in the ready-made garments sector, and they have succeeded in capturing a good market position in India, Nepal, Bhutan. With the help and initiative taken by the SME Foundation, these garments are now exporting their goods in Europe, United States, etc. Some medium and heavy industries are growing here, especially the agricultural industry, crockery, organic fertilizer, oil from recycled tires, light metal industry, etc. There are also some good markets and shopping malls here. Communication is so good here to run a business. The pottery is also very beautiful and unique. It has captured a good market nationally and internationally.
There are 24 private and government banks in Saidpur – most of them have online banking facilities. There are a huge number of ATM booths in the city and near it to facilitate online transactions 24/7.

Historical monuments and culture
Notable historical or cultural monuments are Chini Mosque (1863) at Islambagh, Nat Settlement Prison (1871) at Natun Babu Para, Martuza Institute (1882) near Saidpur railway station, Saidpur Church (1893), Christian Church of Bangladesh (1906). The city has an officers' club and two other clubs and institutes where the city's various dramas and musicals take place. There is also a 150(appx.)-a year-old cultural club called Silpo Sahitto Shongshod. Every year people celebrate Eid al-Fitr, Eid-al-Adha, Bengali New Year (Pohela Baishakh), English New Year, etc. with enthusiasm and festiveness. Nightlife in this city is very festive; the city markets hardly sleep at night.

Language
The official and academic language of the city is Modern Standard Bengali that serves as the lingua franca of the nation, with 98% of Bangladeshis being fluent in Bengali as their first language. However, Bangali community in the city use Rangpuri or Rangpurya dialect, especially the pronunciation of /r/ replaced by /O/ i.e. "অক্ত" instead of "রক্ত" meaning blood in Bengali.

All the Bihari people in the city use Hindi–Urdu as their mother tongue which is noticeable and influential in this city of Bangladesh, where Biharis form around half the population. The language dialect of the non-Bengali-speaking people of the region is slightly different from the modern standard Urdu or Hindi language trending toward Bihari languages. In some traditional wedding of non-Bengali origin, women sing folk songs in Bihari languages particularly in Bhojpuri, Magahi, Awadhi and Maithili. Bihari Hindu people in Saidpur use mostly Bhojpuri among themselves. The use of Urdu may be noticeable in some parts of the market, in local announcements, Urdu musaharati Na'at during Ramadan sehri and Mushaira programs. However, these Hindustani languages are not constitutionally recognized official languages in Bangladesh as for other Indigenous peoples in Bangladesh. However, according to the constitution law (article 23A Act XIV of 2011 section 14), [The State shall take steps to protect and develop the unique local culture and tradition of the tribes, minor races, ethnic sects, and communities.] giving the right of people of minorities to practice their culture and tradition.

Geography and climate 
Saidpur is located in the Rangpur Division at Northern Bangladesh. The elevation of Saidpur is 40 meters. Most of the city and its surrounding area is made of Alluvium Flood plain. The river Khrkharia flows near the city.

The city of Saidpur has a monsoon influenced Humid subtropical climate (Cwa). There are four seasons in Saidpur- A hot and Humid Summer (March–May), rainy and severe monsoon season (June–September), Short and relatively dry Autumn or post Monsoon season (October–November) and a mild, pleasant Winter (December–February).

Education
The city is famous for its educational institutions. Some renowned institutions of this city are Saidpur Government Science College, Bangladesh Railway Govt. School, Saidpur Cantonment Public School and College, Lions school and college, Saidpur, Sunflower School and College, Al-Faruque Academy, Saidpur Government College, Saidpur Adarsha Girls School and College, Cantonment Board High School, Saidpur, International School, Saidpur. Besides those, there are 9 more colleges and more than 50 secondary and primary schools in the city. The city has three colleges that offer undergraduate and degree courses under Bangladesh National University. In recent, four or five schools, as well as colleges, become top on the merit list of Board of Intermediate and Secondary Education, Dinajpur. It has one of the major university co-ordinated by Bangladesh Army named Bangladesh Army University of Science and Technology (BAUST). It offers major undergraduate courses like EEE and BBA, mechanical engineering Mechanical engineering.

Transport

The city is well connected to the country's major cities by railway, bus highways, and airways. Saidpur Airport is the only airport in Rangpur Division. The services of Biman Bangladesh, Regent Airways, and Novoair are available on Saidpur Airport. There are many intercity train services from Saidpur to the capital city Dhaka, Rajshahi, Khulna and other divisions every day. The Nilshagor Express enhanced train transportation. There are more than 650 buses from Saidpur to Dhaka or Chittagong or other big cities. It is a very important commercial city of Bangladesh.

Sports
There are two big sports stadiums and playgrounds are available to meet the city's sports-loving people. Many divisional and district level cricket, football, festival sports take place during the year.

References

External links
 

Populated places in Rangpur Division